The 1990–91 Gamma Ethniki was the ninth season since the official establishment of the third tier of Greek football in 1983. Panetolikos and Pontioi Veria were crowned champions in Southern and Northern Group respectively, thus winning promotion to Beta Ethniki. Proodeftiki and Eordaikos also won promotion as a runners-up of the groups.

Patras, Messolonghi, Thriamvos, Fostiras, Enosis Aris-Neapolis, Preveza, Kyriakiou, Niki Volos, Neoi Epivates, Panargiakos, Kozani and Anagennisi Neapoli were relegated to Delta Ethniki.

Southern Group

League table

Northern Group

League table

References

Third level Greek football league seasons
3
Greece